The Partido para sa Demokratikong Reporma (PDR), commonly known as Partido Reporma,  is a political party in the Philippines.

History 
It was founded by former Defense Secretary Renato de Villa when he left the ruling Lakas-NUCD after failing to get the nomination as the party's presidential candidate in the 1998 elections. He chose then Pangasinan governor Oscar Orbos as his running mate. The Lapiang Manggagawa (Workers' Party) forged an electoral alliance with Reporma for the 1998 elections, and the two parties contested in the elections as "Reporma–LM". However, De Villa and Orbos both lost to Joseph Estrada and Gloria Macapagal Arroyo, respectively. The alliance also failed to win seats in the 1998 Philippine Senate election. Haydee Yorac, Roy Señeres, and Rey Langit were among the candidates who failed to win a single seat in the Senate.

In the 2004 elections, Reporma supported the candidacy of former Senator and Education Secretary Raul Roco from Aksyon Demokratiko, in which Reporma forged an electoral alliance with the PROMDI party of Cebu under the name "Alyansa ng Pag-asa" (Alliance of Hope).

The party won one out of 235 seats in the House of Representatives of the Philippines in the 2004 Philippine general election. The Lapiang Manggawa contested in the 2010 elections on their own, while Reporma has faded from the political scene.

In 2020, former speaker Pantaleon Alvarez resigned from the ruling PDP–Laban and accepted de Villa's offer of him becoming secretary-general of the revived Reporma.

In the 2022 elections, Reporma initially supported the candidacy of Senator Panfilo Lacson, which initially installed him as the party's chairman, replacing Alvarez. The parties of Partido Reporma, United Nationalist Alliance, and Nationalist People's Coalition are in talks to forge an electoral alliance for the 2022 elections. However, on March 24, 2022, Lacson decided to run as an independent and resigned as a member and chairman of the party. Later that day, Alvarez, the party's president endorsed the candidacy of Vice President Leni Robredo. The following month, some members of Partido Reporma (including those from Aklan and Antique) disappointed with Alvarez's decision chose to leave the party and keep following the Lacson-Sotto tandem.

Electoral performance

Presidential and vice presidential elections

Legislative elections

References

Centrist parties in the Philippines